Annie Wardlaw Jagannadham (1864 – 26 July 1894) was an Indian physician trained at Edinburgh. She was the first Indian woman qualified to practice medicine in Britain.

Early life 
Jagannadham was born in Visakhapatnam, one of the six children of Rev. Pulipaka Jagannadham, a Telugu poet, teacher, and Christian missionary, and his wife, Eliza Osborne, a mission teacher, who was also a convert from Hinduism. Her older sister was Eliza Lazarus, married Daniel Lazarus, the headmaster of the Vizagapatam Mission School. Her brother P. Richard Hay Jagannadham was also a doctor trained at Edinburgh. Her niece was Hilda Mary Lazarus (1890–1978), an obstetrician and medical school principal.

Education and career 
Jagannadham studied at Madras University, and pursued further training as a physician at Edinburgh School of Medicine for Women, from 1888 to 1890. She was described as "the first Indian lady who obtained a registerable British diploma." She was a student of Sophia Jex-Blake, who supported scholarships to bring other Indian women students to study medicine in Britain. She also held a certificate in psychological medicine (MPC).

She was house surgeon at the Edinburgh Hospital for Women and Children in 1890. After returning to India, Jagannadham worked as house surgeon at Cama Hospital in Bombay, under hospital head Edith Pechey-Phipson.

Death 
Jagannadham caught an illness described as "some painful disease of the throat" while working at the hospital in Bombay, and died in summer 1894, aged 30 years, at her parents' home.

References 

1864 births
1894 deaths
Indian surgeons
People from Visakhapatnam
Women physicians from India
Alumni of the University of Edinburgh Medical School
19th-century Indian medical doctors